The Whitcomb Farm is an historic farmhouse in East Providence, Rhode Island.  The -story structure was built c. 1780–1805, and is a well-preserved example of Federal architecture.  Its construction is unusual, consisting of a brick structure finished with wood clapboards.  The house has been owned by a number of prominent local citizens, including William Whitcomb, the proprietor the City Hotel in Providence.

The house was listed on the National Register of Historic Places in 1980.

See also
National Register of Historic Places listings in Providence County, Rhode Island

References

Farms on the National Register of Historic Places in Rhode Island
Houses in Providence County, Rhode Island
Buildings and structures in East Providence, Rhode Island
National Register of Historic Places in Providence County, Rhode Island